(born April 6, 1966 in Bremen, Germany) is a German professional pool player. After turning professional in 1991, he continually reached the knockout rounds of the WPA World Nine-ball Championships. He represented Germany at the 2002 World Pool Masters, where he reached the last 16 before losing to Marcus Chamat.

Schmidt has two runner-up finishes at Euro Tour events, the 1996 German Open and 2001 Austrian Open, and four third-place finishes on the tour.

References

External links

German pool players
Living people
Sportspeople from Bremen
1966 births